HMS Bellona was a Thames sailing barge, one of 11 that the Admiralty purchased in 1794 and stationed at Woolwich. Mr. J. Woodward, a sailing master, commissioned her in 1796. Mr. Richard Simmons replaced him in 1798. She became a mud barge in December 1799; she was broken up in 1805.

Citations

References
 

1794 Admiralty purchase Thames sailing barges
Gunboats of the Royal Navy